Ahmet Kıbıl (15 December 1952 – 16 August 2011) was a Turkish alpine skier. He competed at the 1968 Winter Olympics and the 1976 Winter Olympics.

References

1952 births
2011 deaths
Turkish male alpine skiers
Olympic alpine skiers of Turkey
Alpine skiers at the 1968 Winter Olympics
Alpine skiers at the 1976 Winter Olympics
People from Sarıkamış
20th-century Turkish people